Fanthorpe may refer to:
Ursula A. Fanthorpe
Reverend Robert Lionel Fanthorpe